Mesocnemis dupuyi is a species of white-legged damselfly in the family Platycnemididae.

The IUCN conservation status of Mesocnemis dupuyi is "NT", near threatened. The species may be considered threatened in the near future. The IUCN status was reviewed in 2010.

References

Further reading

 

Platycnemididae
Articles created by Qbugbot
Insects described in 1982